Leucopogon imbricatus is a species of flowering plant in the family Ericaceae and is endemic to south-east Queensland. It is an erect shrub with glabrous branches, crowded, often overlapping, egg-shaped leaves, and white, bell-shaped flowers that are bearded inside.

Description
The leaves are crowded, often overlapping, and have a fine sharp point on the rounded tip. The flowers are arranged in leaf axils on a short peduncle with small bracts and broad bracteoles less than half as long as the sepals.

Taxonomy
Leucopogon imbricatus was first formally described in 1810 by Robert Brown in his Prodromus Florae Novae Hollandiae et Insulae Van Diemen. The specific epithet (imbricatus) means "imbricate".

Distribution
This leucopogon grows in south-east Queensland.

References

imbricatus
Ericales of Australia
Flora of Queensland
Plants described in 1810
Taxa named by Robert Brown (botanist, born 1773)